Baron of Hendwr, in the County of Merioneth, is a dormant title in the English Baronage which was granted on 22 July 1284 to Dafydd ap Gruffydd ap Owain Brogyntyn (a cousin of Gruffydd ap Iorwerth, 1st Baron of Kymmer-yn-Edeirnion) by letters patent issued by Edward I at Caenarfon. Dafydd and his kinsmen had fought against Edward I during his Conquest of Wales and, after coming into the King's Peace, received a Royal pardon and had their lands confirmed per Baroniam. The second Baron was summoned to Quo Warranto proceedings on 7 December 1334 at Harlech to assess by what authority he claimed his title and he cited the charter granted to his father in 1284. The daughter of the 3rd Baron, Gwerful ferch Madog was the wife of Goronwy ap Tudur, and therefore 3rd great-grandmother of King Henry VII. The 4th Baron, David de Hendwr married Sibella de Cornwall, daughter and heiress of John de Cornwall, great-grandson of Richard 1st Earl of Cornwall on 8 July 1343 at Westminster Abbey.

For the later history of the barony and the 19th century court case see Giwn Lloyd.

Barons of Hendwr (1284) 
 Dafydd ap Gruffydd, 1st Baron of Hendwr (fl. 1284)
 Gruffydd ap Dafydd, 2nd Baron of Hendwr (fl. 1292–1334), Squire of the Body to Edward I, High Sheriff of Merionethshire in 1300
 Madog de Hendwr, 3rd Baron of Hendwr (fl. 1313–18), who supported Edward II in his Scottish Campaign
 David de Hendwr, 4th Baron of Hendwr
 David de Hendwr, 5th Baron of Hendwr (d. 1390)
 Thomas de Hendwr, 6th Baron of Hendwr (1385–1433)
 Dafydd ap Giwn Lloyd (grandson of the 5th Baron), 7th Baron of Hendwr

See also 

 Baron of Kymmer-yn-Edeirnion
 Nathanael Jones of Hendwr
Giwn Lloyd of Hendwr

References 

Baronies